Christer Alfons Kellgren (born August 15, 1958 in Gothenburg, Sweden) is a retired Swedish professional ice hockey player. He played for Frölunda HC between 1977 and 1981, and again from 1982 to 1989, as well as five games in the National Hockey League for the Colorado Rockies during the 1981–82 season. He later served as Frölunda HC's Director of Hockey Operations.

Career statistics

Regular season and playoffs

External links

1958 births
Living people
Colorado Rockies (NHL) players
Fort Worth Texans players
Frölunda HC players
Ice hockey people from Gothenburg
Swedish ice hockey right wingers
Undrafted National Hockey League players